Little Lost Soul is a studio album by Matt Elliott, released under the moniker The Third Eye Foundation. It was originally released on Domino Recording Company in 2000.

It peaked at number 102 on the CMJ Top 200 chart.

Critical reception
Jason Kane of AllMusic gave the album 4.5 stars out of 5, calling it The Third Eye Foundation's "most consistent" album to date. He added, "The percussion is meticulously constructed; each beat is placed for a purpose and new rhythms are exposed upon repeated listens." Kristen Sage Rockermann of Pitchfork gave the album a 5.8 out of 10, saying, "On Little Lost Soul, Elliot has pointlessly sugared the pill with smoother production, and as a result, the album lacks the power of the dreamworlds its eerie textures allude to."

Track listing

Personnel
Credits adapted from liner notes.
 Matt Elliott – writing, performance, production
 Uncle Vania – original artwork, photography
 Matt Cooper – sleeve manipulation

References

External links
 

2000 albums
Matt Elliott (musician) albums
Domino Recording Company albums
Merge Records albums